= Banka Zotova =

- Island
- Location within Sakhalin Oblast
- Coordinates: 53°25′N 141°42′E
- Country: Russian Federation
- Federal subject: Khabarovsk Krai
- Oblast: Sakhalin Oblast

Banka Zotova is an island in the Sea of Okhotsk near the coast of Sakhalin.

The island is roughly 1.5 miles across at widest point. Administratively it belongs to Sakhalin Oblast.
